Zeyathiri Township is one of Naypyidaw Union Territory's eight townships, located south of Mandalay Region in Myanmar.

History
Zeyathiri Township formerly part of Mandalay Division. The township was designated as one of the original townships constituting the new capital region of Naypyidaw on 26 March 2006 by the Ministry of Home Affairs (MOHA). 

Zeyathiri is derived from Pali , and literally means "glory of the victory."

Demographics

2014

The 2014 Myanmar Census reported that Zeyathiri Township had a population of 111,293. The population density was 186.2 people per km2. The census reported that the median age was 26.6 years, and 100 males per 100 females. There were 26,075 households; the mean household size was 4.0.

References

Naypyidaw